Zhan in Iran may refer to:
 Zhan, Kurdistan
 Zhan, Lorestan
 Zhan Rural District, in Lorestan Province

See also
 Zan, Iran (disambiguation)